Aforia crebristriata is a species of sea snail, a marine gastropod mollusk in the family Cochlespiridae.

It is also considered as the type species of the genus Dallaforia through its synonym Irenosyrinx crebristriata Dall, 1908

Description
The length of the shell attains 48 mm, its diameter 16.5 mm.

(Original description) The shell is of moderate size. It is white, covered with a pale yellow periostracum. The acute spire is a little shorter than the aperture. The six whorls, exclusive of the (lost) nucleus, are rounded. The; suture is very distinct. There is no axial sculpture, except incremental lines, unless on the (eroded) apical whorls. The siphonal fasciole is wide, extending from the suture to an obscure ridge which forms the shoulder of the whorl just behind the periphery.  On the fasciole are six or seven smooth rounded subequal spiral threads with equal or wider interspaces, more crowded anteriorly. Beyond the shoulder are nine similar but coarser threads, sometimes entire, sometimes flattened or even medially sulcate on top, extending over the base, and on the region of the siphonal canal as  many more, smaller and more distant, crossed by obvious incremental lines. The aperture is elongate and rather narrow. The anal sulcus is very wide but shallow. The  outer lip is produced, evenly arcuate to the end of the canal, not constricted at the base of the whorl. The columellar lip is smooth The columella is short, obliquely truncate, gyrate, the axis pervious. The siphonal  canal is wide, hardly differentiated.

Distribution
This marine species is found in the upper abyssal regions from Alaska to Oregon, USA.

References

crebristriata
Gastropods described in 1908